This is a list of video game franchises published by Nintendo, organized alphabetically. All entries include multiple video games, not counting ports or altered re-releases.

List of Nintendo video game franchises

 – This color indicates a sub-series of a larger video game franchise.

References

General 
  Text was copied from Nintendo franchises at Nintendo Wiki, which is released under a Creative Commons Attribution-Share Alike 3.0 (Unported) (CC BY-SA 3.0) license

Specific 

Nintendo franchises
Lists of video game franchises
Nintendo
Video game franchises